USS Hanover (APA-116) was a  in service with the United States Navy from 1945 to 1946. In 1947, she was sold into commercial service. The ship was scrapped in 1972.

History
Hanover was launched under Maritime Commission contract by Ingalls Shipbuilding of Pascagoula, Mississippi, 18 August 1944, loaned to the Navy and simultaneously commissioned 31 March 1945.

The Commanding Officers were
CDR. Henderson, James Hugh, USNR from 31 March 1945 - 20 October 1945.
CAPT. Callaghan, Joseph Anthony, USN, (USNA 1924) from 20 October 1945 - 11 May 1946.

After conducting a brief shakedown cruise off Galveston, Texas, Hanover arrived Gulfport, Mississippi, 3 May 1945 and began loading Marines and SeaBees for transportation to the Pacific. She got underway 6 May and sailed to Pearl Harbor, carrying out training operations en route. After her arrival 24 May, the ship unloaded her troops for further transfer and until 6 June took part in underway training operations in Hawaiian waters. She then sailed for San Francisco in company with other transports, and just before reaching California was diverted to Portland, Oregon, where she arrived 19 June.

Hanover got underway 1 July for Eniwetok Atoll, an important Pacific staging area, expecting to take part in the final assault on Japan. Arriving 14 July, she sailed in convoy 3 days later, bound for Ulithi. The ship remained at this base briefly, using the rest and recreation at Mog Mog island, which is a part of the Ulithi atoll. Troops stayed in bunks that were 6 bunks high. For a few hours a day, a group of troops would exercise on the main deck, then it was back below deck so others could exercise.

She stopped in Manila, Philippines. She was soon bound for Okinawa, where she arrived 12 August 1945. Hanover unloaded replacement troops on that battle-scarred island, and after the close of the war prepared to take part in the occupation. One of the Army officers that had been exercising his troops a few days before, went into the caves on Okinawa and was killed. Some Japanese refused to surrender at the end of the war.

After hostilities
After embarking Army units, Hanover sailed 5 September for Jinsen, Korea, to aid in the occupation, and unloaded her troops three days later. The transport returned to Okinawa 14 September but was soon forced to stand out to sea to ride out the great typhoon of September 1945, see the 1945 Pacific typhoon season. During the typhoon, a ship with electric propulsion had to be towed to keep facing into the winds. The ship propellers would come out of the water at the top of the wave, causing the electric motors to overspeed, which repeatedly tripped the electric circuit breakers. That ship was unable to forward motion and steering and was at risk going boardside to the winds and waves, and of rolling over and sinking. The Hanover was near but did not help with the towing the ship in distress. After the severe weather subsided, Hanover returned to Okinawa and loaded troops for the occupation of China. She arrived Taku 30 September to help stabilize the troubled situation there and aid in the consolidation of the area by Nationalist forces.

Operation Magic Carpet
Hanover'''s next assignment was with the Operation Magic Carpet fleet, bringing home American troops from the Pacific.

While traveling alone, a new sailor was assigned to manually adjust the water make up valve to control the water level. However, the valve was overhead, and the handwheel was below an overhead valve. As the water level in the boiler started to go low, the sailor turn the wheel counter-clockwise (intending to open the valve). But instead he shut off the water, and the ship lost all steam power, propulsion, and steerage. It was a completely silent, sunny clear afternoon. It took hour to light off the boiler and develop enough steam to spin the water pumps, fans, and generators to restore operations.

She spent five days and nights in the fog while approaching Seattle, Washington. The radar image did not resemble the charts of the shoreline. The image showed the land at about 60 foot elevation above sea level (the height of the radar transmitter receiver Feed horn). The ship radioed shore for help in verifying its location. The shore-based radio operators said they could not help. The ship's radio operator instructed the shore operators and the ship's location was established. Later she sailed down the coast and up the river to Portland, Oregon.

She arrived San Francisco on her last voyage 6 February 1946, and was ordered to steam via the Panama Canal. One morning about 4 AM, the Officer of the Deck woke the Captain to show him a crystal clear mirage of a beautiful harbor. The ship steamed on to Norfolk, Virginia, where she arrived 9 March.

Before the war, many radio operators on the Hanover had been lawyers. In combat areas there were always 5 radio operators listening on 5 different radio frequencies   and translating the Morse code signals to characters. Some of the lawyer radio operators were assigned put some of the radar parts in a wooden crate and to nail a wooden lid; the officer returned 10 minutes later and found the crew was betting on who would be able to drive the first nail; that set of lawyers could not hammer a nail; the officer hammered the nail with every strike of the hammer and the lawyers were amazed.

The ship decommissioned on 11 May 1946 and was returned to the Maritime Commission the next day.

Operational Dates Summary
1945 Mar 31 Pascagoula, Mississippi USA
1945 APR 11 New Orleans, Louisiana USA
1945 MAY 01 Galveston, Texas USA
1945 MAY 06 Gulfport, Mississippi USA
1945 MAY 11 Canal Zone, Panama, USA
1945 JUN 01 Pearl Harbor, Hawaii, USA
1945 JUL 01 Portland, Oregon, USA
1945 JUL 17 Eniwetok, Marshall Islands, USA
1945 AUG 12 Okinawa
1945 SEP 09 Okinawa
1945 SEP 11 Jinsen, Korea
1945 SEP 26 Nago Nan Bay, Okinawa
1945 OCT 03 Taku, China
1945 OCT 05 Taku, China
1945 OCT 16 Manila, Philippines 
1945 OCT 23 Manila, Philippines 
1945 OCT 25 Hong Kong, China
1945 OCT 26 Chinwangtao, China
1945 NOV 02 Taku, China
1945 NOV 10 Hong Kong, China
1945 NOV 26 Tsingtao, China
1945 DEC 01 Okinawa
1945 DEC 28 Seattle, Washington USA
1946 JAN 26 Yokosuka, Japan 
1946 FEB 20 San Francisco, California USA
1946 MAR 09 Norfolk, Virginia, USA

Commercial service
The Hanover was purchased by Oceanic Steamship Company in 1947. In 1965 traded to Matson and renamed Venturea No.3. In 1970, she was sold and renamed Entu''. The ship was finally scrapped in Taiwan in 1972.

References

 
Navsource Online: USS Hanover (APA-116)

 

Bayfield-class attack transports
Ships built in Pascagoula, Mississippi
1944 ships
World War II amphibious warfare vessels of the United States
Hanover County, Virginia